George Stiebel (1821-1896) was a Jamaican trader and entrepreneur who became a millionaire with sea transport between North and South America and as the owner of a gold mine. Stiebel is notoriously named Jamaica's first black millionaire.

Family 
His parents were Sigismund Stiebel (1790-1859), a Jew who emigrated from Germany and his housekeeper, a Jamaican of African descent. Sigismund was active as a trader in South America and the West Indies. He later married Eliza Jacob, née Mocatta (1811–1858); the couple's children Adeline, Daniel, Jacob and Rebecca were born between 1837 and 1844. Sigismund was buried three days after his death in London's Balls Pond Jewish Cemetery. His paternal grandfather was Isaac Daniel Stiebel (1764 or 1766-March 26, 1850).

Life
Stiebel left school at the age of 14, worked first for a carpenter and then at the age of 19 at the famous Ferry Inn in Jamaica, between Kingston and Spanish Town. With the start-up capital that his father gave him in the 1840s, he was able to buy one and later two more ships and set up sea transport between North and South America. In the late colonial period of Cuba, he switched to a more lucrative arms trade, which is why he had to stay in prison for a while. In 1851 he married the missionary's daughter Magdalene Baker (1825-1892), with whom he had children Sigismund (1852-1871) and Theresa (1856-1922).

After his ship is said to have sunk off the coast of Venezuela in 1856, he returned a wealthy man in 1873. With three other black men he is said to have discovered a gold mine, which is said to have had a monthly income of 80,000 pounds sterling for several years. While the others gave away their shares at a ridiculous price, he kept his shares and became a millionaire when the mine was later capitalized for $16,000,000.

He acquired 99 properties in Jamaica, including two sugar plantations, a wharf at Church Street, Great Salt Pond and a cattle pen at Minard in the Saint Ann's Bay District. After the Church of England's ownership of the Devon Penn in Kingston, which had been granted to the Geneva minister James Zeller in 1644, expired in October 1879, George Stiebel was able to erect his representative Devon House there two years later. Located in a park, the neoclassical mansion, built in 1881, is now one of the sights of the city of Kingston.

In 1891 he was made Companion to the Order of St Michael and St George and St George by Queen Victoria.

George Stiebel died in 1896 at Devon House with no close family members beside him. His daughter who was in England with his five grandchildren was not able to attend his funeral. He died a year after both his grandson Douglas Jackson (1884-1895) and son-in-law Richard Hill Jackson (1845-1895) died. They died within one week of each other at Devon House.

See also
 Devon House

References

1821 births
1896 deaths

People from Saint Andrew Parish, Jamaica
Colony of Jamaica people
Jamaican businesspeople
Jamaican people of African descent
Jamaican people of German descent
Jamaican people of Jewish descent
Order of St Michael and St George